Phyllonorycter coryli, or nut leaf blister moth, is a moth of the family Gracillariidae. It is found most of Europe, except the Balkan Peninsula.

The wingspan is 7–9 mm. The forewings are golden-ochreous, often fuscous-tinged, first costal spot dark-margined posteriorly. The larva is pale yellowish; dorsal line dark green; head pale brown.

The larvae feed on Corylus avellana, Corylus colurna, Corylus maxima and Ostrya carpinifolia. They mine the leaves of their host plant. They create an upper-surface silvery tentiform mine. At first, the mine remains quite flat, and has the appearance of a blotch mine. At the end, the leaf is strongly contracted. There may be several mines in a single leaf. The pupa is made in a cocoon in a corner of the mine. The frass is deposited in the opposite corner.

References

Gallery

External links
 
 bladmineerders.nl

coryli
Moths described in 1851
Moths of Europe